Acrotome pallescens is a species of flowering plant in the family Lamiaceae. It is native to South Mozambique and South Africa. It was first published in 1848.

References

Lamiaceae
Flora of Mozambique
Plants described in 1848
Taxa named by George Bentham